Circleslide are an American Christian alternative indie rock band from Nashville, Tennessee, and they were formed in 1999. Their members are lead vocalist and guitarist, Gabe Martinez, bass guitarist, Eric Vickers, lead guitarist, Jonathan DeAnda, and drummer, Lee Yoder. The group released, Connectology, an extended play, with Centricity Music, in 2004. They released, Uncommon Days, with Centricity Music, in 2006, as their first studio album. The band released, Echoes of the Light, their second studio album, in 2010, by Save the City Records.

Background
The Christian alternative indie rock band formed in Nashville, Tennessee, in 1999. Their members are lead vocalist and guitarist, Gabe Martinez, bass guitarist, Eric Vickers, lead guitarist, Jonathan DeAnda, and drummer, Lee Yoder. The group's former members were bass guitarist and background vocalist, Tim Martinez, lead guitarist, Aaron Gillies, and drummer, Mark Alvis. They were called by CCM Magazine'''s Paul Coleman as a group to watch, in September 2006. The group was hailed as a Best New Artist of 2006 from Christianity Today, in January 2007.

Music history
The group released an extended play, Connectology, with Centricity Music, in 2004, and it was reviewed by The Phantom Tollbooth. Their first studio album was released by Centricity Music on July 11, 2006, Uncommon Days. This album was reviewed by AllMusic, CCM Magazine, Christian Broadcasting Network, Christianity Today, Cross Rhythms, Jesus Freak Hideout, and twice by The Phantom Tollbooth. The band's second studio album, Echoes of the Light, was released by Save the City Records on October 5, 2010. This album was reviewed by Christianity Today, Cross Rhythms, HM Magazine, and Jesus Freak Hideout.

Members
Current members
 Gabe Martinez – lead vocals, guitar
 Eric Vickers – bass
 Jonathan DeAnda – lead guitar
 Lee Yoder – drums
Former members
 Tim Martinez – bass, background vocals
 Aaron Gillies – lead guitar
 Mark Alvis – drums

Discography
Studio albums
 Uncommon Days (July 11, 2006, Centricity Records)
 Echoes of the Light (October 5, 2010, Save the City)

EPs
 Connectology (2004, Centricity Records)A Sacred Turn: Worship Vol. 1 (2005, Centricity Records)Above the Stratosphere: The B Sides'' (2007, Centricity Records) [digital only]

Awards
 Independent Music Awards, (2005, Contemporary Christian - Song, "Home")

References

External links
 Cross Rhythms artist profile

Christian rock groups from Tennessee
Alternative rock groups from Tennessee
Musical groups established in 1999
Centricity Music artists
1999 establishments in Tennessee